is a song by Japanese singer-songwriter Hikaru Utada. It was released digitally 15 April 2016, alongside "Manatsu no Tōriame" as joint singles for her album Fantôme. The song was the theme to the dorama Toto Neechan. The single is Utada's first release since 2012's Evangelion: 3.0 theme song "Sakura Nagashi", and marks her official comeback to the Japanese music scene.

Composition
"Hanataba o Kimi ni" is a soft J-pop ballad featuring prominent strings, as well as a piano and drums. It is one of her few singles to be completely in Japanese, with no English words in it. Lyrically, it speaks about the appreciation felt for a departed person and symbolically sending them a bouquet to show it. During one verse, she talks about how pain and sorrow were vital for love to exist (If there weren't any of the daily secret pains and loneliness / And there were only fun things / Then we got away without feeling anything like love).

Commercial reception
On 30 April 2016, the song entered Billboard's Japan Hot 100 at number 3, based on strong radio airplay and digital sales. The next week, it rose one place to number 2, which became its peak position on the chart. In its third week the song fell to number 7, then to number 9 and continued to slowly drop down on the chart during the following three months. After 16 weeks, it fell off the chart on the issue dated 20 August, but re-entered the next week at number 64. Boosted by the release of the official music video in early September, "Hanataba o kimi ni"  shot up 52 positions from 79 to 27 and then stayed in the top 40 nearly uninterrupted until early November, reaching number 23 shortly after the album's release. It again descended down the charts and stayed in lower positions throughout November and December, but re-entered the top 20 after New Year's Day. It has spent 45 non-consecutive weeks on the Hot 100, over a timespan of more than a year and a half.

The song has received a double-platinum certification by the RIAJ for digital sales in excess of 500,000 copies or more and became the second-highest-selling download single of the year, behind only "Zenzenzense" by Radwimps. In October 2019, it was awarded triple-platinum for exceeding digital sales of 750,000. It thus became her highest-selling download single since 2008's "Prisoner of Love, which was certified Million.

Track listing

Credits 
Credits adapted from Fantôme liner notes.

Release history

Charts

Weekly charts

Year-end charts

Certifications

References

2016 singles
Hikaru Utada songs
Songs written by Hikaru Utada
Songs about flowers
2016 songs
Universal Music Japan singles
Black-and-white music videos
Pop ballads
Japanese television drama theme songs
2010s ballads